Acharya Jnanendra Prasad Goswamy (25 December 1902 – 29 October 1945) ( Jnan Gossain ), from Bengal, was an Indian vocalist in the Hindustani classical music tradition. 

A renowned exponent of the Bishnupur gharana, he was known for the Khayal, Dhrupad, Thumri and Tappa, along with Raga-pradhan songs.

Early life 
Jnanendra's journey to the world of Indian classical music was initiated at his home under the guidance of his father Bipin Chandra Goswamy, who was a noted esraj player. His next guru was his uncle, Pandit Radhika Prasad Goswamy, a great vocalist of his times. He also got his training form eminent vocalists such as Pandit Girija Shankar Chakrabarty and Ustad Faiyaz Khan.

Professional career
Jnanendra Prasad was instrumental in popularizing Indian Classical music and created an audience of its own. In Bishnupur gharana,  is the main form of music which is addressed to God, and in ancient times used to be sung in temples and king's chambers. He was a close friend of Kazi Nazrul Islam, and recorded many Nazrul Geeti in Bengali. He was associated with Gramaphone Company of India for many years.

References 

1902 births
1945 deaths
Hindustani singers
Indian classical musicians of Bengal
Singers from West Bengal